was a retainer under the current lord over the Ogasawara during the Edo period (17th century) of Japan. Matabei was renowned as a famous adept of the art of the lance. While the famous swordsman Miyamoto Musashi had currently been staying within Kokura, Matabei had visited him at many times as to receive his unique teachings. The lord of Ogasawara had at one time requested Matabei to duel Musashi. Matabei was compelled to fight even though he had not wanted to, as to obey his lord's command. Matabei chose to use a bamboo lance, while Musashi chose an ordinary sword made of wood. At the beginning of their duel, Matabei had at first attacked Musashi with his lance, in which Musashi had then calmly penetrated in close range using the middle-level guard and won two times. Matabei's lance had slid between Musashi's legs the third bout however. Due to this fact, Musashi said, "I was touched, therefore I lost this time". Musashi had then told all of the onlookers how much of an adept Matabei was with the lance. Matabei had later said after the duel, "Master Musashi is a true adept whom I was unable to touch. It was to save my face that he acted as though I had won once out of three times".

References

Miyamoto Musashi - Life and Writings

Takada Matabei